Donald Cullen (14 May 1908 – 30 November 1976) was an Irish sprinter. He competed in the men's 200 metres at the 1928 Summer Olympics.

References

External links
 

1908 births
1976 deaths
Athletes (track and field) at the 1928 Summer Olympics
Irish male sprinters
Olympic athletes of Ireland
Place of birth missing